Snowbank Mountain is in the Beartooth Mountains in the U.S. state of Montana. The peak is in the Absaroka-Beartooth Wilderness in Custer National Forest. The tiny Snowbank Glacier lies immediately southeast of the peak.

References

Snowbank
Beartooth Mountains
Mountains of Carbon County, Montana